Events from the year 1913 in Ireland.

Events
13 January – Edward Carson founds the Ulster Volunteer Force by unifying several existing loyalist militias.
30 January – at Westminster the House of Lords rejects the 3rd Home Rule Bill by 326 to 69.
10 February – John Redmond opens the replacement city bridge over the River Suir in Waterford that will be named after him.
7 July – the Home Rule Bill is once again carried in the House of Commons, despite attempts by Bonar Law to obstruct it.
26 August – Dublin Lock-out: members of James Larkin's Irish Transport and General Workers' Union employed by the Dublin United Tramways Company begin strike action in defiance of the dismissal of trade union members by the chairman, businessman William Martin Murphy. 
31 August – Dublin Lock-out: the Dublin Metropolitan Police kill one demonstrator and injure 400 in dispersing a demonstration in Sackville Street (Dublin).
1 September – protest by locked-out workers lead to serious riots in Dublin. Shops are looted and attempts made to tear up tram lines.

2 September – two tenement houses in Church Street, Dublin, collapse, killing 7 (including 2 children) and leaving 11 families homeless.
3 September – a meeting of 400 employers with William Martin Murphy pledges not to employ any persons who continue to be members of the Irish Transport & General Workers' Union.
7 September – a large meeting in Sackville Street asserts the right of free speech, trade union representation and demands an enquiry into police conduct.
17 September
In Newry, Edward Carson says that a Provisional Government will be established in Ulster if Home Rule is introduced.
In Dublin, labour unrest grows with a march 5,000 through the city.
27 September – 12,000 Ulster Volunteers parade at the Royal Ulster Agricultural Society's show grounds at Balmoral (Belfast) in protest of the Home Rule Bill.
27 September – in Dublin the food ship, The Hare, arrives bringing forty tons of food raised by British trade unionists.
6 October – an official report on the lockout suggests that workers should be reinstated without having to give a pledge not to join the ITGWU.
16 October – 4,000 men and women march through Dublin in support of James Larkin and the Transport Union.
27 October – James Larkin of the ITGWU is sentenced to seven months in prison for seditious language but released after just over a week.
1 November
Kingstown trade unionist James Byrne, arrested for his part in the lockout, dies as the result of a hunger strike.
Professor Eoin MacNeill's article "The North Began", suggesting formation of pro-self-government Irish Volunteers, appears in the Gaelic League newspaper An Claidheamh Soluis, at the suggestion of The O'Rahilly.
10 November – the Dublin Volunteer Corps enrolls over 2,000 men. They declare they will preserve the "civil and religious liberties" of Protestants outside Ulster in the event of Irish Home Rule.
19 November – the Irish Citizen Army is founded by James Larkin, Jack White & James Connolly to protect workers in the general lockout.
25 November – the pro-Home Rule Irish Volunteers are formed at a meeting attended by 4,000 men in Dublin's Rotunda Rink.
28 November – Bonar Law addresses a huge unionist rally in the Theatre Royal in Dublin, declaring that if Home Rule is introduced Ulster will resist and will have the support of his party.

Arts and literature
 George A. Birmingham's comedy General John Regan is premièred in London (8 January) and New York City (13 November).
 Winifred Mary Letts publishes Songs from Leinster.
 Conal Holmes O'Connell O'Riordan produces his play Rope Enough.
 Pádraig Ó Siochfhradha's story An Baile S’Againne is published.
 Katharine Tynan's Irish Poems is published.
 W. B. Yeats' poem "September 1913" is published in The Irish Times during the Dublin Lock-out (8 September). His Poems Written in Discouragement is also published this year.
 English barrister and lyricist Frederic Weatherly publishes the ballad "Danny Boy" set to the Londonderry Air.
 English music hall comedian Arthur Lucan meets and marries (25 November) 16-year-old actress Kitty McShane in Dublin.

Sport

Gaelic games
 All-Ireland Senior Football Championship 1913 Winners: Kerry
 All-Ireland Senior Hurling Championship 1913 Winners: Kilkenny

Football

International
18 January Ireland 0–1 Wales (in Belfast)
15 February Ireland 2–1 England (in Belfast)
15 March Ireland 1–2 Scotland (in Dublin)
Irish League
Winners: Glentoran
Irish Cup
Winners: Linfield 2–0 Glentoran
Derry Celtic are relegated and subsequently voted out of the Irish Football League; they never play senior football again.

Births
19 January – Matt O'Mahoney, international soccer player (died 1992).
22 January – William Conway, Cardinal Archbishop of Armagh (died 1977).
30 January – Kevin Danaher, folklorist and writer (died 2002).
15 February – William Scott, Ulster Scots painter (died 1989).
13 March – Joe Kelly, motor racing driver (died 1993).
29 March – Niall MacGinnis, actor (d. c1977).
13 April – David Grene, classical scholar (died 2002).
14 April – Galbraith Lowry-Corry, 7th Earl Belmore, soldier and deputy lieutenant for County Fermanagh (died 1960).
1 May – Maurice Gibson, Northern Irish judge (died 1987).
19 May – Seán Moore, Fianna Fáil TD (died 1986).
5 June – Peter Doherty, footballer (died 1990).
6 June – Patrick Campbell, 3rd Baron Glenavy, journalist and author (died 1980).
17 August – Harry Baird, soccer player (died 1973).
28 August – John Mackey, Limerick hurler (died 1989).
31 August – Jack Doyle, boxer, actor and singer (died 1978).
20 September – Bernard Bergin, cricketer (died 1985).
23 September – Samuel Edgar, cricketer (died 1937).
25 September – Tony O'Malley, painter (died 2003).
9 October – Harry Bradshaw, golfer (died 1990).
18 October – David Lord, Royal Air Force pilot, posthumous recipient of the Victoria Cross for gallantry at Arnhem (died 1944).
24 November – Geraldine Fitzgerald, film & television actress (died 2005 in the United States)
3 December – Gerry Healy, British Trotskyist leader (died 1989).
Full date unknown – Sigerson Clifford, poet and playwright (died 1985).

Deaths
3 January – James Hamilton, 2nd Duke of Abercorn, politician and diplomat (born 1838).
21 February – John Joseph Hogan, first Bishop of the Dioceses of Saint Joseph, Missouri and Kansas City, Missouri (born 1829).
15 March – Max Arthur Macauliffe, British administrator, scholar and author (born 1841).
25 March – Garnet Wolseley, 1st Viscount Wolseley, soldier (born 1833).
4 April – Edward Dowden, critic and poet (born 1843).
6 April – Somerset Lowry-Corry, 4th Earl Belmore, soldier, politician and Lord Lieutenant for County Tyrone (born 1835).
17 April – Barton McGuckin, tenor singer (born 1852).
25 April – Arthur Thomas Moore, soldier, recipient of the Victoria Cross for gallantry in 1857 at the Battle of Khushab, Persia (born 1830).
22 May – Edward Gibson, 1st Baron Ashbourne, lawyer and Lord Chancellor of Ireland (born 1837).
1 June – James O'Halloran, lawyer and politician in Quebec (born c1820).
1 October – Eugene O'Keefe, businessman and philanthropist in Canada (born 1827).
5 October – Patrick Augustine Sheehan, priest, author and political activist (born 1852).
19 October – Emily Lawless, writer, died in England (born 1845).
18 December – Thomas Kingsmill Abbott, scholar and educator (born 1829).

References

 
1910s in Ireland
Ireland
Years of the 20th century in Ireland
Ireland